War pensions are almost certainly the most ancient type of social security. Plutarch's Life of Solon mentions a law which provides that those who are maimed in war shall be maintained at the public charge. Halsbury's Laws of England traced their history back to the days of King Alfred. Until 1978 the British War Pension scheme was run entirely under the Royal Prerogative and completely without legislation.

See also
 Veterans' benefits (United States)

References

External links

Pensions for veterans

War
Social security in the United Kingdom